Just Say Yes may refer to:

Film and Television 
 "Just Say Yes" (It's a Living)
 "Just Say Yes" (Sex and the City)
 "Just Say Yes" (Sliders)
 Just Say Yes (film), a 2021 Dutch romantic comedy film

Music 
 Just Say Yes (compilation album), a 1987 Sire Records sampler and the album series named for it
 Just Say Yes (Punchline album), or the title song, 2008
 Just Say Yes (EP), a 2008 EP by The Narrative
 "Just Say Yes" (song), a 2009 song by Snow Patrol
 "Just Say Yes", a 1990 single by The Dickies
 "Just Say Yes", a song by Dido from Girl Who Got Away
 "Just Say Yes", a song by The Cure from Greatest Hits
"(Do You Love Me) Just Say Yes", 1988 single by Highway 101